Usoi can refer to:

Usoi, Bulgaria, a village that was merged with Elena in 1971
Usoi Dam, a natural landslide dam on the Murghab River in Tajikistan
Usoi language, a Bodo language spoken in Bangladesh
USOI, the United Socialist Organisation of India, a former political alliance in India